Doncho is a Bulgarian and Macedonian masculine given name in use in Bulgaria and North Macedonia as a diminutive form of Andon. Notable people with this name include the following.

Given names
Doncho Atanasov (born 1983), Bulgarian footballer
Doncho Donchev (born 1974), Bulgarian artist and illustrator
Doncho Donev (born 1967), Bulgarian footballer 
Doncho Papazov (born 1939), Bulgarian oceanographer, adventurer and journalist
Doncho Zhekov (born 1952), Bulgarian wrestler

See also

Donchō the Japanese form of Damjing, which is the Korean name of a 7th-century Buddhist priest

Notes

Bulgarian masculine given names
Macedonian masculine given names